Mother Hubbard may refer to:
"Old Mother Hubbard", a nursery rhyme
Mother Hubbard dress, from the South Seas
Mother Hubbard, another name for a camelback steam locomotive